Maggie and Sam are Walter Lantz characters, who made their first appearance in the cartoon "Crazy Mixed Up Pup", in 1955. Their final appearance was in 1957, in "Fowled Up Party". They were created by Tex Avery. Maggie was voiced by Grace Stafford and Sam by Daws Butler.

Sam appeared alone in a handful of Woody Woodpecker cartoons during the 1960s.

List of appearances
Crazy Mixed Up Pup (02/14/1955)
The Ostrich Egg And I (04/09/1956)
The Talking Dog (10/22/1956)
Fowled Up Party (02/11/1957)
Crowin' Pains Sam, alone (10/01/1962)
The Tenant's Racket Sam, alone (07/26/1963)
Woody and the Beanstalk Sam, alone (03/26/1966)

See also
List of Walter Lantz cartoons
List of Walter Lantz cartoon characters

References

External links 
 The Walter Lantz-o-Pedia

Film characters introduced in 1955
Universal Pictures cartoons and characters
Walter Lantz Productions shorts
Animated duos
Walter Lantz Productions cartoons and characters